Blumental (German: Valley of flowers) may refer to:

 Felicja Blumental (1908–1991), a Polish pianist and composer.  
Blumental, former German name for the village of Piętki, Poland

See also
Blumenthal (disambiguation)
Bloemendaal (disambiguation)